The Great Western Railway (GWR) 1366 Class was a class of 0-6-0 pannier tank steam locomotives built in 1934.  They were a useful design and because of their light weight and short wheelbase and were often used on dockside branches or other lines with sharp curvatures.

History and development
The 1366 class was one of only two pannier tank designs built by the GWR that utilised outside cylinders, although various existing engines inherited by the GWR had pannier tanks and outside cylinders. The 1366 class was developed from the 1361 Class but differed by including a pannier tank rather than a saddle tank, Belpaire firebox, etc. They were designed to replace the 1392 Class.

Operational history

Originally, five of the six locomotives of the class were allocated to Swindon shed; No. 1371 was originally sent to Llanelly but when they were taken over by British Railways Western Region in 1948 three of the six had been reallocated to Weymouth for use on the docks there.

In 1950 the situation remained as it had in 1948 while by 1955 one of the locomotives had moved shed allocation from Swindon to Taunton (although actually used at Bridgwater) with three still remaining at Weymouth and this in turn continued until 1959. With the move from steam to diesel the first of the class to be withdrawn was 1370 which was withdrawn from Weymouth shed in January 1960 followed by 1371 from Swindon shed in November of that year and then 1366 from Taunton the following February.

However, the three remaining locomotives were offered a new lease of life. No. 1369 was sent via Yeovil to Wadebridge and after successful clearance trials had taken place numbers 1367 and 1368 followed, the locomotives being used to replace the Beattie Well Tanks that had run over the Bodmin and Wadebridge Railway to Wenfordbridge for the previous 87 years. However, dieselisation caught up with them again, and all three were withdrawn in 1964 having operated for just 2 years in Cornwall. The final locomotive, 1369, left Wadebridge under its own steam for the Dart Valley Railway on 20 February being the last operational British Railways steam locomotive to be based in Cornwall.

One example, No. 1369, survives on the South Devon Railway.

See also
 GWR 0-6-0PT – list of classes of GWR 0-6-0 pannier tank, including table of preserved locomotives

References
Notes

Bibliography

 reprinted in facsimile edition,

External links 

 http://www.greatwestern.org.uk/m_in_060_1366.htm
 http://www.southdevonrailwayassociation.org/1369-hist.html

1366
0-6-0PT locomotives
Railway locomotives introduced in 1934
Standard gauge steam locomotives of Great Britain
Shunting locomotives